Georg Wolfgang Wedel (12 November 1645 – 6 September 1721) was a German professor of surgery, botany, theoretical and practical medicine, and chemistry.

Biography
Wedel was born in Golßen, Niederlausitz, and received his Doctor of Medicine degree from the University of Jena in 1669.

He published research on alchemy and pharmaceutical chemistry. He studied the plating of copper onto iron using a solution of copper sulfate and volatile salts obtained from plants. Wedel also invented new medicines and produced a translated German edition of the Greek Bible.

Wedel's sons, Ernst Heinrich Wedel (1 August 1671 – 13 April 1709) and Johann Adolph Wedel (1675–1747) were also physicians.

Works
 Georgii Wolffgangi Wedelii pharmacia acroamatica . Bielcke / Krebs, Jenae 1686 Digital edition by the University and State Library Düsseldorf
 Syllabus Materiae Medicae Selectioris.  Bielcke / Krebs, Jenae 1701 Digital edition of the University and State Library Düsseldorf.
 Georgii Wolffgangi Wedelii amoenitates materiae medicae.Bielcke, Jenae;  Werther, Jenae 1704 Digital edition of the University and State Library Düsseldorf.
 Georgii Wolffgangi Wedelii compendium chimiae, theoreticae et practicae, methodo analyticae propositae . Bielcke / Krebs, Jenae 1715 Digital edition by the University and State Library Düsseldorf

References

External links
 

1645 births
1721 deaths
People from Dahme-Spreewald
17th-century German physicians
18th-century German physicians
German surgeons
17th-century German botanists
18th-century German chemists
18th-century German philosophers
German translators
University of Jena alumni
Academic staff of the University of Jena
17th-century German chemists